Machiavelli is a surname. Notable people with the name include:

 Niccolò Machiavelli, an Italian political philosopher, musician, poet and romantic comedic playwright
 Nicoletta Machiavelli, an Italian film actress 
 Zanobi Machiavelli, an Italian painter and illuminator

See also 

 Machiavelli (disambiguation)

surnames